Gary Howell is a Republican member of the Michigan House of Representatives who has represented Lapeer County since 2016.

Prior to his election to the House, Howell was the chairman of the Lapeer County Road Commission and president of the Lapeer Intermediate School District board.

Howell won a special election to succeed Todd Courser who resigned from the House after a scandal.

References

Living people
Republican Party members of the Michigan House of Representatives
21st-century American politicians
Year of birth missing (living people)